Sukhbir Singh Gill (born 14 December 1975 in Chandigarh) is a former field hockey midfielder from India, who made his international debut for the Men's National Team in 1995 during the Sultan Azlan Shah Hockey Tournament in Kuala Lumpur, Malaysia. Gill represented his native country at the 2000 Summer Olympics in Sydney, Australia, where India finished in seventh place.

References
 Bharatiya Hockey

External links

1975 births
Living people
Field hockey players from Chandigarh
Male field hockey midfielders
Field hockey players at the 2000 Summer Olympics
2002 Men's Hockey World Cup players
Olympic field hockey players of India
People from Chandigarh district
Indian male field hockey players